Margaret Mary Wall, Baroness Wall of New Barnet (14 November 1941 – 25 January 2017) was a British trade unionist. She was Chair of the Labour Party from 2001 to 2002.  Wall was also a former national secretary and head of policy of AMICUS.

The daughter of Thomas Mylott and Dorothy Walker, she was educated at Druids Cross Independent School and at Notre Dame Collegiate School in Liverpool. She was further educated at Ruskin College, Liverpool University.

On 10 June 2004, she was created Baroness Wall of New Barnet, of New Barnet in the London Borough of Barnet.

She was the Chair of Barnet and Chase Farm NHS Hospitals Trust until 2014, when she was appointed Chairman of Milton Keynes Hospital NHS Foundation Trust.

References

1941 births
2017 deaths
Alumni of the University of Liverpool
British trade unionists
Life peeresses created by Elizabeth II
Wall of New Barnet
Chairs of the Labour Party (UK)
New Barnet